Live, Raw & Uncut is a music DVD/CD combo from the Hard rock band Poison, released in 2008 for their summer tour. It sold around 2,400 copies in its first week of release to debut at position No. 8 on Billboard's Top Music Videos chart.

CD

Live, Raw & Uncut CD is Poison's first full live album, the previous live albums Swallow This Live included new studio tracks and Power to the People was considered a half live, half studio album. "Live, Raw & Uncut" features 14 live Poison hits from their 2007 summer tour.

Track listing
CD:

 "Intro
 "Look What the Cat Dragged In"
 "I Want Action"
 "Ride the Wind"
 "I Won't Forget You"
 "C.C.'s Guitar Solo"
 "I Hate Every Bone In Your Body But Mine"
 "Something To Believe In"
 "Rikki's drum solo"
 "Unskinny Bop"
 "Every Rose Has Its Thorn"
 "Fallen Angel"
 "Talk Dirty to Me"
 "Nothin' but a Good Time"

DVD
Live, Raw & Uncut DVD is a live concert from 2007, recorded at Verizon Wireless Amphitheatre in St. Louis, Missouri, in support of their 2007 cover album Poison'd. "Live, Raw & Uncut" also includes a photo gallery and behind the scenes footage. The DVD features a slightly different track list to the cd, containing four extra tracks.

Track listing
DVD:

 "Intro"
 "Look What the Cat Dragged In"
 "I Want Action"
 "Ride the Wind"
 "I Won't Forget You"
 "What I Like About You"
 "C.C.'s Guitar Solo"
 "I Hate Every Bone In Your Body But Mine"
 "Something To Believe In"
 "Can't You See"
 "Your Mama Don't Dance"
 "I Need to Know"
 "Rikki's drum solo"
 "Unskinny Bop"
 "Every Rose Has Its Thorn"
 "Fallen Angel"
 "Talk Dirty to Me"
 "Nothin' but a Good Time"

Credits
 Bret Michaels: lead vocals, guitars, harmonica
 C.C. DeVille: guitar, backing vocals, lead vocals on "I Hate Every Bone In Your Body But Mine"
 Bobby Dall: bass, backing vocals
 Rikki Rockett: drums, backing vocals
 Will Doughty: keyboards, piano, backing vocals

Charts

References

External links
Official website

2008 video albums
Live video albums
2008 live albums
Poison (American band) live albums
Poison (American band) video albums